The 1971 Monaco Grand Prix was a Formula One motor race held at Monaco on May 23, 1971. This was the last race on the original Monaco circuit, as a dedicated pit lane was created along the harbor before Tabac in 1972.

Events of the race are captured in the documentary film Weekend of a Champion in which Roman Polanski shadows Jackie Stewart.

Race report 
Qualifying was extremely wet and so it was Friday morning times that really counted for the grid - for Mario Andretti this was particularly unfortunate as his car was stranded out on the track at this time and so he was unable to qualify despite lying second in the World Championship. Jackie Stewart claimed a stunning pole position over a second ahead of his front row companion Jacky Ickx and shot into an immediate lead from the fast-starting Jo Siffert, Ickx, Pedro Rodríguez, Ronnie Peterson and Denny Hulme. Chris Amon stalled on the grid and Graham Hill - seeking a 6th Monaco win - made a rare mistake, hitting the wall at Tabac on the 2nd lap.

Stewart extended his lead from Siffert and Ickx, despite being painfully ill from fumes leaking into the cockpit. Peterson was astonishing the crowd with his valiant attempts to take 4th place from Rodríguez, who was baulking him as much as was legally possible. Hulme actually managed to join the battle and pass Peterson on one lap. Eventually the Mexican slipped up under pressure and locked up a wheel to let both Peterson and Hulme through.

The Who used parts of the Grand Prix and showed Jackie Stewart in the music video for the song "Baba O'Riley".

Classification

Qualifying

Race 

 - Andrea de Adamich was listed as the driver of the #19 March, but never drove. Galli was entered instead.

Championship standings after the race

Drivers' Championship standings

Constructors' Championship standings

Note: Only the top five positions are included for both sets of standings.

References

Monaco Grand Prix
Monaco Grand Prix
Grand Prix